Darren Wilson may refer to:
 Darren Wilson (musician) (born 1986), drummer of The Hush Sound, an American indie rock band
 Darren Wilson (police officer) (born 1986), American law-enforcement officer in Ferguson, Missouri, who fatally shot Michael Brown
 Darren Wilson (umpire) (born 1974), Australian rules football boundary umpire